Begonia hainanensis is a species of plant in the family Begoniaceae. It is endemic to China. It grows in forests and on mossy rocks.

References

Flora of China
hainanensis
Endangered plants
Taxonomy articles created by Polbot
Plants described in 1939